Neuenwalde is a village in the municipality of Geestland in Lower Saxony.

The village is located northeast of Langen and between Bremerhaven and Cuxhaven.

Neuenwalde was first mentioned in 1334.

References

Cuxhaven (district)
Villages in Lower Saxony